Vladimir Michev (born 20 November 1986) is a Bulgarian footballer who plays as a midfielder for Bulgarian Third League club Sevlievo.

Michev previously played for Vidima-Rakovski Sevlievo, Etar 1924, Montana, Levski Karlovo and Lokomotiv Gorna Oryahovitsa.

References

External links
 
 

Bulgarian footballers
1986 births
Living people
People from Sevlievo
Association football midfielders
First Professional Football League (Bulgaria) players
Second Professional Football League (Bulgaria) players
PFC Vidima-Rakovski Sevlievo players
FC Etar 1924 Veliko Tarnovo players
FC Montana players
FC Levski Karlovo players
FC Lokomotiv Gorna Oryahovitsa players
FC Kariana Erden players